Animal Stories is a British pre-school animated television series. It also aired on Disney Channel's Playhouse Disney block in the United States from 1998 to 2001 and on Disney Channel in the rest of Asia. The series gained a 2001 Children's BAFTA for Best Pre-school Animation.

Plot
Every episode of the series focuses on a different individual animal, who is unique in personality. The entire episode rhymes.

Episodes

Season 1 (1998)

Season 2 (1999)

Season 3 (2000)

Season 4 (2001)

DVD release
Mill Creek Entertainment released Animal Stories- The Complete Series on DVD in Region 1 on 18 May 2010.

References

External links

Animal Stories at Toonhound

ITV children's television shows
Television series by ITV Studios
1998 British television series debuts
2001 British television series endings
1990s British children's television series
2000s British children's television series
English-language television shows
British children's animated anthology television series
BAFTA winners (television series)
Disney Channel original programming
London Weekend Television shows
1990s British animated television series
2000s British animated television series